Larissa Netšeporuk ( Larisa Teteryuk; born 24 December 1970 in Romny, Ukrainian SSR, Soviet Union) is a retired heptathlete who represented Ukraine and Estonia.

Achievements

Personal bests
Outdoor

References

External links

1970 births
Living people
People from Romny
Ukrainian heptathletes
Athletes (track and field) at the 2000 Summer Olympics
Olympic athletes of Estonia
Estonian heptathletes
Estonian sportswomen
World Athletics Championships athletes for Estonia
Sportspeople from Sumy Oblast